Mark David Chapman (born May 10, 1955) is an American man who murdered former Beatles member John Lennon in New York City on December 8, 1980. As Lennon walked into the archway of his apartment building The Dakota, Chapman shot Lennon from a few yards away with a Charter Arms Undercover .38 Special revolver. Lennon was hit four times from the back. Chapman remained at the scene reading J. D. Salinger's novel The Catcher in the Rye until he was arrested by police. He planned to cite the novel as his manifesto.

Raised in Decatur, Georgia, Chapman had been a fan of the Beatles, but was incensed by Lennon's lifestyle and public statements, such as his remark about the band being "more popular than Jesus" and the lyrics of his later songs "God" and "Imagine". In the years leading up to the murder, Chapman developed a series of obsessions, including artwork and the music of Todd Rundgren. The Catcher in the Rye took on great personal significance for him, to the extent that he wished to model his life after the novel's protagonist, Holden Caulfield. Chapman also contemplated killing other public figures, including Johnny Carson, Paul McCartney, Ronald Reagan and Elizabeth Taylor. He had no prior criminal convictions and had just resigned from a job as a security guard in Hawaii.

Following the murder, Chapman's legal team intended to mount an insanity defense based on the testimony of mental health experts who said that he was in a delusional psychotic state. He was more cooperative with the prosecutor, who argued that his symptoms fell short of a schizophrenia diagnosis. As the trial approached, he instructed his lawyers that he wanted to plead guilty based on what he had decided was the will of God. The judge granted Chapman's request and deemed him competent to stand trial. He was sentenced to a prison term of 20 years to life with a stipulation that mental health treatment would be provided.

Chapman refused requests for press interviews during his first six years in prison; he later said that he regretted the murder and did not want to give the impression that he killed Lennon for fame and notoriety. He ultimately supplied audiotaped interviews to journalist Jack Jones, who used them to write the investigative book Let Me Take You Down: Inside the Mind of Mark David Chapman in 1992. In 2000, Chapman became eligible for parole, which has since been denied 12 times. His life was dramatized in the films The Killing of John Lennon (2006) and Chapter 27 (2007).

Biography
Mark David Chapman was born on May 10, 1955, in Fort Worth, Texas. His father, David Chapman, was a staff sergeant in the U.S. Air Force, and his mother, Diane (née Pease), was a nurse. His younger sister, Susan, was born seven years later. As a boy, Chapman stated he lived in fear of his father, who he said was physically abusive towards his mother and unloving towards him. Chapman began to fantasize about having God-like power over a group of imaginary "little people" who lived in the walls of his bedroom. He attended Columbia High School in Decatur, Georgia. By the time he was 14, Chapman was using drugs and skipping classes. He once ran away from home to live on the streets of Atlanta for two weeks. He said he was often bullied at school because of his mediocre athleticism.

In 1971, Chapman became a born-again Presbyterian and distributed Biblical tracts. He met his first girlfriend, Jessica Blankenship, and began work as a summer camp counselor at the South DeKalb County, Georgia YMCA. He was very popular with the children, who nicknamed him "Nemo" (after the protagonist of the Jules Verne novel Twenty Thousand Leagues Under the Sea) and was promoted to assistant director after winning an award for Outstanding Counselor. Those who knew him in the caretaking professions unanimously called him an outstanding worker.

Chapman read J.D. Salinger's The Catcher in the Rye on the recommendation of a friend. The novel eventually took on great personal significance for him, to the extent he reportedly wished to model his life after its protagonist, Holden Caulfield. After graduating from Columbia High School, Chapman moved for a time to Chicago and played guitar in churches and Christian night spots while his friend did impersonations. He worked successfully for World Vision with Vietnamese refugees at a resettlement camp at Fort Chaffee in Arkansas, after a brief visit to Lebanon for the same work. He was named an area coordinator and a key aide to program director David Moore, who later said Chapman cared deeply for the children and worked hard. Chapman accompanied Moore to meetings with government officials, and President Gerald Ford shook his hand.

Chapman joined Blankenship as a student at Covenant College, an evangelical Presbyterian liberal arts college in Lookout Mountain, Georgia. However, Chapman fell behind in his studies and became obsessed with guilt over having a previous affair. He started having suicidal thoughts and began to feel like a failure. He dropped out of Covenant College after just one semester, and his girlfriend broke off their relationship soon after. Chapman returned to work at the resettlement camp but left after an argument with a supervisor. In 1977, Chapman moved to Hawaii, where he attempted suicide by carbon monoxide asphyxiation. He connected a hose to his car's exhaust pipe, but the hose melted and the attempt failed. A psychiatrist admitted Chapman to Castle Memorial Hospital for clinical depression. Upon his release from the ward, he began working at the hospital as a janitor. After Chapman's parents began divorce proceedings, his mother joined him in Hawaii.

In 1978, Chapman embarked on a six-week trip around the world. The vacation was partly inspired by the film and novel Around the World in 80 Days. He visited Tokyo, Seoul, Hong Kong, Singapore, Bangkok, New Delhi, Beirut, Geneva, London, Paris, and Dublin. He began a relationship with his travel agent, a Japanese American woman named Gloria Abe, whom he married on June 2, 1979. Chapman got a job at Castle Memorial Hospital as a printer, working alone rather than with staff and patients. He was then fired by the hospital and later, rehired; following an argument with a nurse he finally quit. After this, Chapman took a job as a night security guard at a high end apartment complex and began drinking heavily to cope with his depression. He developed a series of obsessions, including artwork, The Catcher in the Rye, music, and the musician John Lennon. In September 1980, he wrote a letter to a friend, Lynda Irish, in which he stated, "I'm going nuts." He signed the letter, "The Catcher in the Rye." Chapman had no criminal convictions prior to his trip to New York City to kill Lennon.

Murder of John Lennon

Motive and planning

Chapman allegedly started planning to kill English musician John Lennon three months prior to the murder. A longtime fan of Lennon's band the Beatles, Chapman turned against Lennon due to a religious conversion and Lennon's highly publicized 1966 remark about the Beatles being "more popular than Jesus." Some members of Chapman's prayer group made a joke in reference to Lennon's song "Imagine": "It went, 'Imagine, imagine if John Lennon was dead.'" Chapman's childhood friend Miles McManushe recalled that he said that the song was "communist".

Chapman had also been influenced by Anthony Fawcett's John Lennon: One Day at a Time about Lennon's lifestyle in New York. According to his wife Gloria, "He was angry that Lennon would preach love and peace but yet have millions". Chapman later said: "He told us to imagine no possessions and there he was, with millions of dollars and yachts and farms and country estates, laughing at people like me who had believed the lies and bought the records and built a big part of their lives around his music." He also recalled having listened to Lennon's solo albums in the weeks before the murder: 

Chapman's planning has been described as "muddled."  Over the years, Chapman has both supported and denied whether he felt justified by his spiritual beliefs at the time or had the intention of acquiring notoriety. The only time he made a public statement before his sentencing — and for several years afterward — was during a brief psychotic episode in which he was convinced that the meaning of his actions was to promote The Catcher in the Rye, which amounted to a single letter mailed to The New York Times asking the public to read the novel.

Journalist James R. Gaines, who interviewed Chapman extensively, concluded that Chapman did not kill Lennon to become popular. According to Chapman in a later parole hearing, he had a hit list of other potential targets in mind, including Lennon's  bandmate Paul McCartney, talk show host Johnny Carson, actress Elizabeth Taylor, actor George C. Scott, former first lady Jacqueline Kennedy Onassis, recently-elected US president Ronald Reagan, and Hawaii governor George Ariyoshi. In 2010, he said that the only criterion for the list was being "famous," and that he chose Lennon out of convenience.

It is rumored that Chapman traveled to Woodstock, New York, during one of his visits to the state in search of Todd Rundgren, another target of obsession. Chapman was wearing a promotional T-shirt for Rundgren's album Hermit of Mink Hollow when he was arrested and had a copy of Runt: The Ballad of Todd Rundgren in his Manhattan hotel room. Rundgren was not aware of the connections until much later. On the day of the murder, singer David Bowie was appearing on Broadway in the play The Elephant Man. "I was second on his list," Bowie later said. "Chapman had a front-row ticket to The Elephant Man the next night. John and Yoko were supposed to sit front-row for that show too. So the night after John was killed there were three empty seats in the front row. I can't tell you how difficult that was to go on. I almost didn't make it through the performance."

October–December 1980

Chapman went to New York in late October 1980 intending to kill Lennon, but left to obtain ammunition from his unwitting friend in Atlanta before returning in November. During his October trip to New York, Chapman was inspired by the film Ordinary People to stop his plans. He returned to Hawaii and told his wife that he had been obsessed with killing Lennon. Chapman showed her the gun and bullets, but she did not inform the police or mental health services. Chapman later said that the commandment "thou shalt not kill" flashed on the television at him and was on a wall hanging that his wife put up in their apartment. He made an appointment to see a clinical psychologist, but he did not keep it and flew back to New York on December 6, 1980. At one point, he considered ending his life by jumping from the Statue of Liberty.

On December 7, Chapman accosted singer James Taylor at the 72nd Street subway station. According to Taylor, "The guy had sort of pinned me to the wall and was glistening with maniacal sweat and talking some freak speak about what he was going to do and his stuff with how John was interested and he was going to get in touch with John Lennon." He also reportedly offered cocaine to a taxi driver. That night, Chapman and his wife talked on the phone about getting help with his problems by first working on his relationship with God.

On the morning of December 8, Chapman left his room at the Sheraton Hotel, leaving personal items behind that he wanted the police to find. He bought a copy of The Catcher in the Rye in which he wrote "This is my statement", signing it "Holden Caulfield." He then spent most of the day near the entrance to the Dakota apartment building where Lennon lived, talking to fans and the doorman. Early in the morning, Chapman was distracted and missed seeing Lennon step out of a cab and enter the Dakota. Later in the morning, he met Lennon's housekeeper who was returning from a walk with Lennon's five-year-old son Sean. Chapman reached in front of the housekeeper to shake Sean's hand and called him a beautiful boy, quoting Lennon's song "Beautiful Boy (Darling Boy)."

Around 5 p.m., Lennon and his wife Yoko Ono were leaving the Dakota for a recording session at the Record Plant. As they walked toward their limousine without saying a word, Chapman held out a copy of Lennon's album Double Fantasy for Lennon to sign. Amateur photographer Paul Goresh (1959–2018) was standing by and took a picture as Lennon signed the album. Chapman said in an interview that he tried to get Goresh to stay, and he asked another loitering Lennon fan to go out with him that night. He suggested that he would not have murdered Lennon that evening if the girl had accepted his invitation or if Goresh had stayed, but he probably would have tried another day.

Around 10:50 p.m., Lennon and Ono returned to the Dakota in a limousine. They got out of the vehicle, passed Chapman, and walked toward the archway entrance of the building. From the street behind them, Chapman fired five hollow-point bullets from a .38 special revolver, four of which hit Lennon in the back and shoulder. One newspaper later reported that Chapman called out "Mr. Lennon" and dropped into a combat stance before firing. Chapman said that he does not recall saying anything, and Lennon did not turn around.

Chapman remained at the scene and appeared to be reading The Catcher in the Rye when the NYPD officers arrived and arrested him without incident. The first responders recognized that Lennon's wounds were severe and decided not to wait for an ambulance; they rushed him to Roosevelt Hospital in a squad car. Lennon was pronounced dead on arrival. Three hours later, Chapman told the police, "I'm sure the big part of me is Holden Caulfield, who is the main person in the book. The small part of me must be the Devil."

Legal process 
Chapman was charged with second-degree murder. He admitted to police that he had used hollow-point bullets "to ensure Lennon's death".  Gloria Chapman had known of her husband's preparations for killing Lennon, but she took no action because Chapman did not follow through at the time; she was not charged. Chapman later said that he harbored a "deep-seated resentment" toward his wife, "that she didn't go to somebody, even the police, and say, 'Look, my husband's bought a gun and he says he's going to kill John Lennon.'"

Mental state assessment
More than a dozen psychologists and psychiatrists interviewed Chapman in the six months prior to his trial—three for the prosecution, six for the defense, and several more on behalf of the court—and they conducted a battery of standard diagnostic procedures and more than 200 hours of clinical interviews. All six defense experts concluded that Chapman was psychotic; five diagnosed paranoid schizophrenia, while the sixth felt that his symptoms were more consistent with manic depression. The three prosecution experts declared that his delusions fell short of psychosis and instead diagnosed various personality disorders. The court-appointed experts concurred with the prosecution's examiners that he was delusional yet competent to stand trial. In the examinations, Chapman was more cooperative with the prosecution's mental health experts than with those for the defense; one psychiatrist conjectured that he did not wish to be considered "crazy" and was persuaded that the defense experts only declared him insane because they were hired to do so.

Charles McGowan had been pastor of Chapman's church in Decatur, Georgia, and he visited Chapman. "I believe there was a demonic power at work," he said. Chapman initially embraced his old religion with new fervor as a result; but McGowan revealed information to the press that Chapman had told him in confidence, so Chapman disavowed his renewed interest in Christianity and reverted to his initial explanation: he had killed Lennon to promote the reading of The Catcher in the Rye.

Guilty plea
Chapman's court-appointed lawyer Herbert Adlerberg withdrew from the case amid threats of lynching. Police feared that Lennon fans might storm the hospital, so they transferred Chapman to Rikers Island for his personal safety.

At the initial hearing in January 1981, Chapman's new lawyer Jonathan Marks instructed him to enter a plea of not guilty by reason of insanity. In February, Chapman sent a handwritten statement to The New York Times urging everyone to read The Catcher in the Rye, calling it an "extraordinary book that holds many answers." The defense team sought to establish witnesses as to Chapman's mental state at the time of the killing. However, Chapman told Marks in June that he wanted to drop the insanity defense and plead guilty. Marks objected with "serious questions" over Chapman's sanity and legally challenged his competence to make this decision. In the pursuant hearing on June 22, Chapman said that God had told him to plead guilty and that he would not change his plea or ever appeal, regardless of his sentence. Marks told the court that he opposed Chapman's change of plea, but Chapman would not listen to him. Judge Dennis Edwards Jr. refused a further assessment, saying that Chapman had made the decision of his own free will, and declared him legally competent to plead guilty.

Sentencing hearing
The sentencing hearing took place on August 24, 1981. Two experts gave evidence on Chapman's behalf. Judge Edwards interrupted Dorothy Lewis, a research psychiatrist who was relatively inexperienced in the courtroom, indicating that the purpose of the hearing was to determine the sentence and there was no question of Chapman's criminal responsibility. Lewis had maintained that Chapman's decision to change his plea did not appear reasonable or explicable, and she implied that the judge did not want to allow an independent competency assessment. The district attorney argued that Chapman committed the murder as an easy route to fame. Chapman was asked if he had anything to say, and he rose and read a passage from The Catcher in the Rye in which Holden tells his little sister Phoebe what he wants to do with his life:

I keep picturing all these little kids playing some game in this big field of rye and all. Thousands of little kids, and nobody's around – nobody big, I mean – except me. And I'm standing on the edge of some crazy cliff. What I have to do, I have to catch everybody if they start to go over the cliff – I mean if they're running and they don't look where they're going I have to come out from somewhere and catch them. That's all I do all day. I'd just be the catcher in the rye and all.

The judge ordered psychiatric treatment for Chapman during his incarceration and sentenced him to 20 years to life, 5 years less than the maximum sentence of 25 years to life.

Imprisonment

In 1981, Chapman was imprisoned at Attica Correctional Facility outside of Buffalo, New York. He fasted for 26 days in February 1982, so the New York State Supreme Court authorized the state to force-feed him. Central New York Psychiatric Center director Martin Von Holden said that Chapman refused to eat with other inmates but agreed to take liquid nutrients. He was held in a solitary confinement unit for violent and at-risk prisoners, in part due to concern that he might be harmed by Lennon's fans in the general population. There were 105 prisoners in the facility who were "not considered a threat to him," according to the New York State Department of Correctional Services. He had his own cell, but spent "most of his day outside his cell working on housekeeping and in the library."

Chapman worked in the prison as a legal clerk and kitchen helper. He was barred from participating in the Cephas Attica workshops, a charitable organization helping inmates adjust to life outside prison. He was also prohibited from attending the prison's violence and anger management classes due to concern for his safety. He told a parole board in 2000 what he would do if paroled: "I would immediately try to find a job, and I really want to go from place to place, at least in the state, church to church, and tell people what happened to me and point them the way to Christ." He also said that he thought that he could find work as a farmhand or return to his previous trade as a printer.

Chapman is in the Family Reunion Program and has been allowed regular conjugal visits since 2014 with his wife, since he accepted solitary confinement. The program allows him to spend 44 hours alone with his wife in a specially built prison home. He also gets occasional visits from his sister, clergy, and a few friends. In 2004, Department of Correctional Services spokesman James Flateau said that Chapman had been involved in three "minor incidents" between 1989 and 1994 for delaying an inmate count and refusing to follow an order. On May 15, 2012, he was transferred to the Wende Correctional Facility in Alden, New York, which is east of Buffalo, New York. On March 30, 2022, he was transferred to the Green Haven Correctional Facility in Beekman, New York, which is in Dutchess County.

Book, interviews, and media appearances
Chapman refused all requests for interviews following the murder and during his first six years at Attica, later claiming that he did not want to give the impression that he killed Lennon for fame and notoriety. Despite his claim that he refused all interviews during those six years, James R. Gaines interviewed him and wrote a three-part, 18,000-word People magazine series starting in 1981 and climaxing in February and March 1987. Chapman told the parole board that he regretted the interview. He later gave a series of audio-taped interviews to Jack Jones of the Rochester Democrat and Chronicle, and Jones published Let Me Take You Down: Inside the Mind of Mark David Chapman, the Man Who Killed John Lennon in 1992. Jones asked Chapman to tell his story for Mugshots, a CourtTV program in 2000, with his first parole hearing approaching. Chapman refused to go on camera but consented to tell his story in a series of audiotapes.

On December 4, 1992, ABC's 20/20 aired an interview with Barbara Walters, Chapman's first television interview. On December 17, 1992, Larry King interviewed Chapman on his CNN program Larry King Live.

Parole applications, campaigns, and denial
Chapman first became eligible for parole in 2000 after serving twenty years in prison. Under New York state law, he is required to have a parole hearing every two years from that year onward. Since that time, a two or three member board has denied Chapman parole twelve times. Before Chapman's first parole hearing, Yoko Ono sent a letter to the board requesting that Chapman should stay behind bars and serve out the remainder of his life sentence. In addition, New York State Senator Michael Nozzolio, chairman of the Senate Crime Victims, Crime and Correction Committee, wrote to Parole Board Chairman Brion Travis saying: "It is the responsibility of the New York State Parole Board to ensure that public safety is protected from the release of dangerous criminals like Chapman."

Timeline

 2000: During the 50-minute hearing, Chapman claimed that he was not a threat to society and that Lennon would have approved of his release. The parole board however concluded that releasing him would "deprecate the seriousness of the crime and serve to undermine respect for the law" and that Chapman granting media interviews represented a continued interest in "maintaining [his] notoriety." They noted that Chapman had a good disciplinary record while in prison, but he had been in solitary confinement and did not have access to "anti-violence and/or anti-aggression programming." Correctional Association of New York lawyer Robert Gangi said that he thought it unlikely that Chapman would ever be freed because the board would not risk the "political heat" of releasing John Lennon's killer. Yoko Ono stated that if Chapman were released, she and John's sons would not feel safe for the rest of their lives. “I am afraid it will bring back the nightmare, the chaos and confusion once again” she added.
 2002: Despite a positive behavioral record, the board again stated that releasing Chapman after 22 years in prison would "deprecate the seriousness" of the crime. Some counter-arguments have stated that this basis was no predictor of his potential community behavior.
 2004: The parole board held a third hearing and declined parole. One of the reasons given by the board was that Chapman had subjected Yoko Ono to "monumental suffering by her witnessing the crime." Another factor was concern for Chapman's safety; several Lennon fans threatened to kill him upon his release. Ono's letter opposing his release stated that Chapman would not be safe outside of prison. The board reported that its decision was based on the interview, a review of records, and deliberation. By this time, approximately 6,000 people had signed an online petition opposing his release.
 2006: The parole board held a 16-minute hearing and concluded that his release would not be in the best interest of the community or his own personal safety. On the 26th anniversary of Lennon's death, Ono published a one-page advertisement in several newspapers, saying that December 8 should be a "day of forgiveness," but she was not sure if she was ready to forgive Chapman.
 2008: Chapman was denied parole at his fifth hearing "due to concern for the public safety and welfare."
 2010: In advance of Chapman's scheduled sixth parole hearing, Ono said that she would again oppose his parole, stating that her safety, that of John's sons, and Chapman's would be at risk. The parole board postponed the hearing in September, stating that it was awaiting additional information to complete Chapman's record. On September 7, the board denied Chapman's parole application, with the panel stating that "release remains inappropriate at this time and incompatible with the welfare of the community."
 2012: Chapman's seventh parole hearing was held in August and the board announced the following day that his parole request was denied, on the grounds that they believed he would reoffend. "Despite your positive efforts while incarcerated, your release at this time would greatly undermine respect for the law and tend to trivialize the tragic loss of life which you caused as a result of this heinous, unprovoked, violent, cold and calculated crime."
 2014: Chapman's eighth parole application was denied. Chapman told the board, "I am sorry for being such an idiot and choosing the wrong way for glory.… I found my peace in Jesus. I know him. He loves me. He has forgiven me. He has helped in my life like you wouldn't believe." The board was unmoved, telling Chapman that it believed that "there is a reasonable probability that you would not live and remain at liberty without again violating the law."
 2016: Chapman's parole was denied. Chapman said that he now saw his crime as being "premeditated, selfish and evil."
 2018: Denied for the tenth time, the parole board wrote to Chapman that he was at low risk to reoffend, but that he "admittedly carefully planned and executed the murder of a world-famous person for no reason other than to gain notoriety." The board added, "While no one person's life is any more valuable than another's life, the fact that you chose someone who was not only a world-renowned person and beloved by millions, regardless of pain and suffering you would cause to his family, friends, and so many others, you demonstrated a callous disregard for the sanctity of human life and the pain and suffering of others. This fact remains a concern to this panel."
 2020: Chapman's parole was denied for the eleventh time. Officials said he was refused parole as "it would be incompatible with the welfare of society". According to the tapes acquired by ABC News, he sought glory in killing a member of the Beatles.
 2022: In Chapman’s twelfth parole hearing, he admitted he knew what he did was wrong, but “wanted the fame too much”. The board denied his parole due to his action leaving “the world recovering from the void of which he created”.
 2024: Chapman's thirteenth parole hearing is scheduled for February.

In film
Two biographical films center on Chapman and the murder:
 The Killing of John Lennon (2006), directed by Andrew Piddington and starring Jonas Ball as Chapman.
 Chapter 27 (2007), directed by J. P. Schaefer and starring Jared Leto as Chapman.

In music
The rock band Måneskin wrote the song "MARK CHAPMAN" about a killer stalking a celebrity on the album "RUSH!" (2023).

...And You Will Know Us By The Trail of Dead released the song "Mark David Chapman" on their 1999 album Madonna.

The industrial band Mindless Self Indulgence released the song  "Mark David Chapman", also written as "Mark David Chapmen" on Spotify, on the 2008 album "If".

References

Works cited

Further reading
 Bresler, Fenton. Who Killed John Lennon? London: Sidgwick & Jackson (Nov. 1990). .

External links

 New York Department of Correctional Services inmate information page Chapman's DIN is 81-A-3860
 Article on Mark Chapman which argues that he killed for fame (BBC News)
 BBC News report with actual news footage from the time on right hand side of page
 "Mark David Chapman, The Catcher in the Rye, and the Killing of John Lennon" by John W. Whitehead, 2000

1955 births
20th-century American criminals
American assassins
American male criminals
American people convicted of murder
American prisoners sentenced to life imprisonment
Christians from Texas
Crime in New York (state)
Criminals from Georgia (U.S. state)
Criminals from Hawaii
Criminals from New York (state)
Criminals from Texas
Living people
Male murderers
People convicted of murder by New York (state)
People from Decatur, Georgia
People from Fort Worth, Texas
People from Kailua-Kona, Hawaii
People with mood disorders
People with personality disorders
People with schizophrenia
Prisoners sentenced to life imprisonment by New York (state)